Mansfield Club Grounds, also known as Mansfield Park  and Fort Hill Grounds, is a former baseball ground located in Middletown, Connecticut. The ground was home to the Middletown Mansfields baseball club during the 1872 season, from May 2nd until July 4th. Like the team, it was named after Civil War General Joseph K. Mansfield.

The land for the ballpark, which overlooked Middletown, the Connecticut River, and the Valley Railroad, was donated in 1871 by Dewitt Clinton Sage who owned a brick factory in Middletown. The former site is now a residential development.

References

Baseball venues in Connecticut
Defunct baseball venues in the United States
Sports venues in Middlesex County, Connecticut
Defunct sports venues in Connecticut